The 1973 NCAA Men's Water Polo Championship was the fifth annual NCAA Men's Water Polo Championship to determine the national champion of NCAA men's college water polo. Tournament matches were played at the Belmont Plaza Pool in Long Beach, California during December 1973.

California defeated UC Irvine in the final, 8–4, to win their first national title.

The leading scorer for the tournament was Bruce Kocsis from USC (8 goals). The award for Most Outstanding Player was not given out this year, but an All-Tournament Team was named.

Qualification
Since there has only ever been one single national championship for water polo, all NCAA men's water polo programs (whether from Division I, Division II, or Division III) were eligible. A total of 8 teams were invited to contest this championship.

Bracket
Site: Belmont Plaza Pool, Long Beach, California

All-tournament team 
Bruce Kocsis, USC
Bruce Black, UC Irvine
Jim Kruse, UC Irvine

See also 
 NCAA Men's Water Polo Championship

References

NCAA Men's Water Polo Championship
NCAA Men's Water Polo Championship
1973 in sports in California
December 1973 sports events in the United States
1973